The 2010–11 Scottish Junior Cup was the 125th season of the Scottish Junior Cup, the national knockout tournament for member clubs of the Scottish Junior Football Association. The competition is sponsored by Emirates and is known as The Emirates Junior Cup for sponsorship purposes. Auchinleck Talbot won the competition for a record ninth time, defeating Musselburgh Athletic 2–1 after extra-time.

Under a 2007 rule change, the Junior Cup winners (along with winners of the North, East and West regional leagues) qualify for the senior Scottish Cup; Auchinleck Talbot therefore competed in the 2011–12 Scottish Cup.

All 162 member clubs of the SJFA entered this season's tournament, a rise from 159 in season 2009–10. Newmachar United entered in their debut Junior season, Stonehouse Violet returned after one year in abeyance and RAF Lossiemouth were re-admitted after one season's suspension owing to an unfulfilled fixture in the 2008–09 competition.

The final of the competition was broadcast live on BBC ALBA.

Calendar

Drawn matches are replayed the following weekend. Replays ending in a draw proceed direct to penalty shootout.

First round
The First Round draw took place at Hampden Park, Glasgow on 30 August 2010.

1 Tie played at Elgin City F.C.

Replays

Second round
The Second Round draw took place in the Linlithgow Rose Social Club on 10 October 2010.

2 Tie played at Bellshill Athletic F.C.3 Tie played at Ashfield F.C.4 Tie played at Lugar Boswell Thistle F.C.

Replays

Third round
The Third Round draw took place in the Evening Times newspaper offices, Glasgow, on 9 November 2010.

After nine weather-related postponements, the tie between Blantyre Victoria and Broughty Athletic finally went ahead at the Ravenscraig Regional Sports Facility in Motherwell, and became the first ever competitive match to be played indoors in Scotland.

5 Tie played at Ravenscraig Regional Sports Facility6 Tie played at Montrose F.C.7 Tie played at Buckie Rovers F.C.

Replays

8 Tie played at Scone Thistle F.C.

Fourth round
The Fourth Round draw took place at Hampden Park on 11 January 2011.

Replays

9 Tie played at Alloa Athletic F.C.

Fifth Round
The Fifth Round draw took place in the Scottish Sun newspaper offices on 15 February 2011. The date for the Fifth Round ties was also revised to 26 February 2011.

Replays

Quarter-finals
The draw for the quarter-finals took place on Real Radio on Tuesday 8 March 2011.

Semi-finals
The draw for the semi-finals took place at Hampden Park on 31 March 2011.

First leg

Second leg

Final

References

External links
SJFA

4
Scottish Junior Cup seasons